Louk may refer to:

People

 Louk Hulsman (1923–2009), Dutch criminologist
 Louk Sanders (born 1950), Dutch tennis player
 Louk Sorensen (born 1985), German-Irish tennis player

Other
 Loukanikos, a riot dog in the Greek protests of the early 2010s